Raiden Tameemon (雷電爲右衞門), born Seki Tarōkichi (January 1767 – 11 February, 1825), was a Japanese sumo wrestler from Tōmi, Nagano Prefecture. He is considered one of the greatest rikishi in history, although he was never promoted to yokozuna, as the title did not exist during the time of his life. To date, he holds the record for best top division win ratio of all time.

Early life
Raiden was born to a farming family in a village in rural Shinano Province. He is said to have possessed great physical strength even in childhood. His father Hanemon, who enjoyed sumo as much as sake, allowed 14-year-old Raiden to attend sumo classes at Nagaze (today called Murokocho), the neighbouring village. When Raiden was 17, the Urakaze-beya stablemaster noticed him when he came through the area while on jungyō (regional tour) with his wrestlers. He was especially impressed with the young man's physique, which was extraordinary at the time. He also had matching long arms and large hands; a handprint at the Shofukuji temple near Okayama, which is said to be of Raiden's hand, measures  from the wrist to the tip of the middle finger.

When Urakaze Kazuki invited him to Edo and started training him, it turned out that Raiden possessed not only the body of a giant (by 18th-century Japanese standards), but also a talent for sumo wrestling. He was especially talented in oshi-sumo techniques and was able to move at a high speed considering his size. Soon Raiden left his stable and unofficially joined Isenoumi-beya, where yokozuna Tanikaze became his coach.

Professional sumo career 
In 1789, the shikona (wrestler name) "Raiden", which means "thunder bolt", appeared in the banzuke ranking, although Raiden did not have his debut until fall 1790. Raiden was ranked as a sekiwake, as was common practice then. He had the best record in the basho (tournament) without a defeat. After Tanikaze's death, Raiden was promoted to ōzeki in March 1795, a rank he retained for nearly 17 years. Between November 1793 and April 1800, Raiden finished with the best record in all tournaments he participated in, ahead of the other great fighters of his time, Tanikaze and Onogawa. After 1800, he remained dominant, and sumo officials even disallowed him to use his favourite techniques in order to keep his matches interesting.

Of the 35 tournaments in which he participated (there were only two basho a year at the time), Raiden had the best record in no fewer than 28. In seven of those, he won without suffering a single defeat or draw. In total, he achieved 254 victories and only ten defeats, a winning percentage of 96.2, an all-time record. His longest winning streaks were eleven consecutive tournaments, or 44 bouts. Raiden's championships are, however, regarded as unofficial by the Japan Sumo Association, as before the current yūshō system was established in 1909, there was no prize given for individual performances in tournaments.

Retirement from sumo 
Finally, in spring 1811, Raiden retired from sumo at the age of 43. He became chairman of the sumo association of Izumo Province (in today's Shimane Prefecture), where his sponsor daimyō resided. In 1816, he moved to Edo and finished his diary Shokoku Sumo Hikae-cho ("journal of sumo in various regions"), which describes his time as an active wrestler since 1789.

After his death, he was buried in Akasaka in Edo. Two locks of his hair are buried in other graves which are located in his home village and in Matsue in Shimane.

When Raiden was still an active wrestler, his home village's residents built monuments honoring his parents. Raiden himself contributed a sake barrel made of stone in memory of his father. Since his death, Raiden has appeared not only as subject of a number of statues, but also on postage stamps, beer labels, and manga.

Lack of yokozuna promotion
Despite his dominance at the time, Raiden never was promoted to yokozuna, the highest rank in sumo. The exact reason for this remains a mystery in the history of the sport.

Journalist Masahiko Nomi theorized that the 19th Yoshida Oikaze granted yokozuna licences to only two wrestlers, Tanikaze and Onogawa, and had not intended to honour any more in the future. Decades later, the 20th Yoshida Oikaze attempted to defeat the Gojo family, which wanted to promote Kashiwado and Tamagaki to yokozuna, by awarding a yokozuna licence to Ōnomatsu Midorinosuke. Ōnomatsu became the first new yokozuna in nearly 40 years.

Another theory has suggested that the reason for the snub may have been due to clan politics. Raiden's sponsor, Daimyo Matsudaira Harusato, was a descendant of Yūki Hideyasu, a son of Tokugawa Ieyasu. The Yoshida family, who held the privilege of awarding the yokozuna licenses, supported the Hosokawa clan, who had a history of supporting Ishida Mitsunari.

Yokozuna was not formally recognized as rank on the banzuke until the beginning of the 20th century. When Jinmaku Kyūgorō erected the yokozuna memorial monument at Tomioka Hachiman Shrine in 1900, he included Raiden's name as a "peerless rikishi", in spite of his never having been officially promoted.

Top division record 
The actual time the tournaments were held during the year in this period often varied.
 
 
    
    
  
 
    
    
  
 
    
    
  
 
    
    
  
 
    
    
  
 
    
    
  
 
    
    
  
 
    
    
  
 
    
    
  
 
    
    
  
 
    
    
  

    
    
  

    
    
  

    
    
  

    
    
  

    
    
  

    
    
  

    
    
  

    
    
  

    
    
  

    
    
  

    
  

*Championships for the best record in a tournament were not recognized or awarded before the 1909 summer tournament and the above unofficial championships are historically conferred. For more information see yūshō.

See also

List of sumo record holders
Glossary of sumo terms
List of past sumo wrestlers

References

External links
Raiden's basho results

1767 births
1825 deaths
Japanese sumo wrestlers
Ōzeki
Sumo people from Nagano Prefecture
Japanese diarists
18th-century diarists
19th-century diarists